Dudah Chay (also Romanized as Dūdah Chāy; also known as Deheh Chāy) is a village in Ilat-e Qaqazan-e Gharbi Rural District, Kuhin District, Qazvin County, Qazvin Province, Iran.

Demographics
At the 2006 census, its population was 506, in 119 families.

References 

Populated places in Qazvin County
Populated places in Iran